Zyg-11 family member B, cell cycle regulator is a protein that in humans is encoded by the ZYG11B gene.

References

Further reading 

 

Genes on human chromosome 1
Armadillo-repeat-containing proteins